Myocyte-specific enhancer factor 2D is a protein that in humans is encoded by the MEF2D gene.

Interactions 
MEF2D has been shown to interact with:

 CABIN1,
 EP300,
 MAPK7,
 Myocyte-specific enhancer factor 2A,
 NFATC2
 Sp1 transcription factor,  and
 YWHAQ.

See also 
 Mef2

References

Further reading

External links 
 

Transcription factors